Cidny Bullens (formerly Cindy Bullens; born March 21, 1950) is an American singer-songwriter, who is best known for serving as backup vocalist on tours and albums with Elton John and Rod Stewart, as well as providing vocals on the soundtrack of the 1978 feature film Grease. In 2012, Bullens publicly came out as a transgender man and changed his name to Cidny Bullens.

Career
Bullens released two albums in the late 1970s on United Artists and Casablanca and another in 1989.

Bullens' 1978 debut album, Desire Wire, is described flatly by William Ruhlmann for AllMusic: "One of the great lost rock albums of the 1970s, Bullens' debut release is full of tough, passionate, incredibly catchy rock & roll played to the hilt and sung with fire".

In 1974, Bullens performed background vocals on Gene Clark's album No Other and as one of the Sex-O-Lettes on the debut album by Disco-Tex and the Sex-O-Lettes. Bullens was also on Don Everly's solo album Sunset Towers, Bryan Adams'You Want It, You Got It, and many others.

Bullens also served as a backup vocalist on Rod Stewart's Atlantic Crossing, and with Elton John on three major tours, his album Blue Moves and his hit with Kiki Dee, "Don't Go Breaking My Heart" (both released in 1976).

Bullens provided vocals on three songs ("It's Raining on Prom Night", "Mooning", and "Freddy, My Love") on the soundtrack of the 1978 feature film, Grease. The album release Grease was nominated for the 1979 Grammy Award for "Album of the Year".

In 1980, Bullens earned another Grammy nomination: Grammy Award for Best Female Rock Vocal Performance, for the single "Survivor.”

In January 1980, Bullens hit the Billboard Hot 100 with the song "Trust Me". It peaked at No. 90. He withdrew from the music business in the early 1980s to raise a family, returning in the early and mid-1990s as a songwriter and then later as a touring and recording artist. Since 1999, Bullens has toured extensively all over the US, Canada, Europe and Australia, has appeared on several major TV shows, including Late Night with Conan O'Brien, Today Show, and CBS This Morning and many radio and TV stations around the world. He is featured in two documentaries, On This Island and Space Between Breaths (and scored the music).  Bullens wrote the music and lyrics for the musical Islands in 2000, which played on Broadway for a special performance at the New Victory Theater in September 2001, two weeks after 9/11.

In 1999, Bullens' album Somewhere Between Heaven and Earth (Artemis Records) was recorded in the first two years after the death of his daughter Jessie. It features Bonnie Raitt, Lucinda Williams, Rodney Crowell, Beth Nielsen Chapman, Bryan Adams, and top-tier musicians including George Marinelli, Benmont Tench, Kenny Edwards, and Michael Rhodes. Steven Soles co-produced one track, Tony Berg co-produced three tracks, and Rodney Crowell co-produced three tracks. It won the AFIM Best Rock Album in 2000 and was widely acclaimed.

In 2001, Bullens released Neverland; co-produced with Ray Kennedy, the album features Emmylou Harris, Steve Earle, and John Hiatt. In 2005, he released dream #2 again co-produced with Ray Kennedy. The title track features Elton John on piano. Delbert McClinton sings a duet with Bullens on "This Ain't Love" and Boston Red Sox knuckleballer Tim Wakefield adds his voice to "7 Days".

In 2007, Bullens formed a new group, The Refugees, with music veterans Wendy Waldman and Deborah Holland. Their first CD, Unbound, was released in January 2009. Their second album "Three" was released in February 2012.

In June 2010, Bullens' released Howling Trains and Barking Dogs on MC Records (Koch). The CD is a compilation of songs he co-wrote in Nashville during the early and mid-1990s with Radney Foster, Bill Lloyd, Al Anderson, Matraca Berg, Mary Ann Kennedy Kye Fleming, and Jimmy Tittle. The CD also includes two new songs written by him alone.

In August 2020, Bullens released his first album as Cidny, Walkin' Through This World, co-produced by Bullens and Ray Kennedy (Lucinda Williams, Steve Earle, Rodney Crowell). This new album is loosely themed around Cidny's transition, featuring the provocative first single "The Gender Line".

Bullens is also the subject of the award-winning documentary short The Gender Line (directed by TJ Parsell and produced by Bill Brimm), which played in many film festivals worldwide in 2019–20.

Personal life
Bullens grew up in Massachusetts. In 1979, Bullens married Dan Crewe, brother of songwriter/producer Bob Crewe, and divorced in 2002. Their daughter Reid was born in 1982. In 1996, their younger daughter, Jessie, born in 1985, died at age 11, of complications from Hodgkin lymphoma.

As an artistic outlet for coming out as transgender, in February 2016, Bullens debuted a "one wo/man show" entitled Somewhere Between – Not an Ordinary Life. Nashville Scene voted it to be the "Best One-Person Show of 2016".

Discography

Solo career 
 Desire Wire  (United Artists Records, 1979) – LP and cassette.
 Steal the Night (Casablanca Records, 1979) – LP and cassette.
 Cindy Bullens  (MCA Records, 1989) – LP, cassette and CD. 
 Why Not?  (Blue Lobster Records, 1994) – Cassette and CD. 
 Somewhere Between Heaven and Earth (Artemis Records, 1999) – LP, cassette and CD.
 Neverland (Artemis Records, 2001) – LP, cassette and CD.
 Dream Number 29 (Blue Rose Records, 2005) – Cassette and CD.
 Howling Trains and Barking Dogs (M.C. Records, 2010) – LP and CD.
 Walkin' Through This World (Blue Lobster Records, 2020) - CD, digital

With the Refugees 

Unbound (Wabuho Records, 2009)
Three (Wabuho Records, 2012)
How Far It Goes (Wabuho Records, 2019)

References

External links
Official website
Somewhere Between: Not an Ordinary Life
Portland Musician Shares Personal Story

1950 births
Living people
20th-century American singers
21st-century American singers
American male pop singers
American session musicians
Casablanca Records artists
LGBT people from Massachusetts
American LGBT singers
American LGBT songwriters
MCA Records artists
Musicians from Boston
Singers from Massachusetts
Songwriters from Massachusetts
Transgender men
Transgender singers
Transgender songwriters
United Artists Records artists
21st-century American LGBT people
American male songwriters
Transgender male musicians
American transgender writers